The DAF-14 is a gene of the nematode Caenorhabditis elegans encoding a R-SMAD protein of TGF-beta signaling pathway, which will be phosphorylated and forms a heterodimer with phosphorylated daf-8 when the TGF-β ligand daf-7 binds to the TGF-β receptors daf-1/daf-4, then the heterodimer enter to the nucleus to inhibit transcription regulated by daf-3/daf-5.

References 

Caenorhabditis elegans genes